Swinburne or Swinburn is an English surname. Notable people with the surname include the following:

Swinburn
Sir Richard Swinburn (1937–2017), British Lieutenant General, Commander of the UK Field Army
Wally Swinburn, (born 1937), Horse racing jockey
Walter Swinburn (1961–2016), British racing jockey and trainer, son of Wally Swinburn

Swinburne
Alan Swinburne (born 1946), English footballer
Algernon Charles Swinburne, English poet
 George Swinburne, Australian engineer, politician and public man.
 Henry Swinburne, 18th century British traveller and author
 Henry Swinburne (lawyer), 16th century English ecclesiastical lawyer and writer
 Sir James Swinburne, 9th Baronet, Northumbrian electrical innovator and industrialist
 John Swinburne (disambiguation), multiple people
 Kay Swinburne, MEP for Wales (2009–)
 Lyn Swinburne, founder of Breast Cancer Network Australia
 Nora Swinburne, actress
 Richard Swinburne, philosopher of religion 
 Robert Swinburne (disambiguation)
 Thomas Thackeray Swinburne, a 20th-century American poet from Rochester, New York
Tom Swinburne (1915–1969), English footballer
Trevor Swinburne (born 1953), English footballer
 William Swinburne (locomotive builder), 19th century American steam locomotive manufacturer
 William T. Swinburne (1847–1928), US rear admiral and one-time Commander-in-Chief of the US Pacific Fleet.
 The Swinburne baronets

English-language surnames